The 2015 FedEx Cup Playoffs, the series of four golf tournaments that will determine the season champion on the U.S.-based PGA Tour, were played from August 27 to September 27. It included the following four events:
The Barclays – Plainfield Country Club, Edison, New Jersey
Deutsche Bank Championship – TPC Boston, Norton, Massachusetts
BMW Championship – Conway Farms Golf Club, Lake Forest, Illinois
Tour Championship – East Lake Golf Club, Atlanta, Georgia

These were the ninth FedEx Cup playoffs since their inception in 2007.

The point distributions can be seen here.

Regular season rankings

For the full list see here.

The Barclays
The Barclays was played August 27–30. Of the 125 players eligible to play in the event, five did not enter: Rory McIlroy (ranked 9), Louis Oosthuizen (28), Sergio García (31), Francesco Molinari (99) and Retief Goosen (111). Of the 120 entrants, 72 made the second-round cut at 142 (+2).

Jason Day won by six strokes over Henrik Stenson and moved from second place to first place in the standings. The top 100 players in the points standings advanced to the Deutsche Bank Championship. This included eight players who were outside the top 100 prior to The Barclays: Zac Blair (ranked 106th to 45th), Spencer Levin (115 to 80), Jason Dufner (103 to 82), Carlos Ortiz (112 to 83), Mark Wilson (114 to 85), Luke Donald (119 to 87), Johnson Wagner (101 to 92) and Camilo Villegas (123 to 99). Eight players started the tournament within the top 100 but ended the tournament outside the top 100, ending their playoff chances: Pádraig Harrington (ranked 87th to 103rd), Greg Owen (90 to 104), John Peterson (93 to 105), Adam Scott (94 to 106), Adam Hadwin (95 to 107), Charl Schwartzel (96 to 108), John Huh (97 to 110) and Francesco Molinari (99 to 111).

Par 70 course

Deutsche Bank Championship
The Deutsche Bank Championship was played September 4–7. Of the 100 players eligible to play in the event, Sergio García (ranked 43) and Will Wilcox (89) did not play. Of the 98 entrants, 75 made the second-round cut at 145 (+3).

Rickie Fowler won by one stroke over Henrik Stenson and moved into third place in the standings. The top 70 players in the points standings advanced to the BMW Championship. This included four players who were outside the top 70 prior to the Deutsche Bank Championship: Hunter Mahan (91 to 52), Keegan Bradley (71 to 63), Jerry Kelly (94 to 65), and William McGirt (88 to 68). Four players started the tournament within the top 70 but ended the tournament outside the top 70, ending their playoff chances: Marc Leishman (61 to 72), Jim Herman (64 to 74), Kevin Streelman (65 to 75) and Boo Weekley (70 to 76).

Par 71 course

BMW Championship
The BMW Championship was played September 17–20, after a one-week break. All 70 players eligible to play in the event did so, and there was no cut.

Jason Day won by six strokes over Daniel Berger. The top 30 players in the points standings advanced to the Tour Championship. This included four players who were outside the top 30 prior to the BMW Championship: Daniel Berger (46 to 9), Scott Piercy (44 to 20), Kevin Na (34 to 27), and Harris English (32 to 30). Four players started the tournament within the top 30 but ended the tournament outside the top 30, ending their playoff chances: Daniel Summerhays (26 to 31), Russell Knox (29 to 34), Ben Martin (25 to 35) and Jason Bohn (28 to 40).

Par 71 course

Reset points
The points were reset after the BMW Championship.

Tour Championship
The Tour Championship was played September 24–27. Of the 30 golfers qualified for the tournament, only Jim Furyk (wrist injury), did not play. There was no cut.

Jordan Spieth won the tournament and the FedEx Cup, beating Danny Lee, Justin Rose, and Henrik Stenson by four strokes.

Par 70 course

Final leaderboard

For the full list see here.

Table of qualifying players
Table key:

* First-time Playoffs participant

22 players extended their streak of reaching the FedExCup Playoffs every year: Bill Haas, Jeff Overton, Matt Kuchar, Ian Poulter, John Senden, Ryan Moore, Charley Hoffman, Pat Perez, Nick Watney, Bubba Watson, Jerry Kelly, Luke Donald, Brandt Snedeker, Charles Howell III, Justin Rose, Hunter Mahan, Adam Scott, Jim Furyk, Sergio Garcia, Zach Johnson, Rory Sabbatini and Phil Mickelson.

Eight players failed to advance to the FedExCup Playoffs for the first time: Freddie Jacobson, Brian Davis, Bo Van Pelt, Ernie Els, Geoff Ogilvy, Aaron Baddeley, K. J. Choi, and Steve Stricker.

Nine rookies finished inside the top 125: Justin Thomas (36), Tony Finau (39), Daniel Berger (46), Scott Pinckney (78), Adam Hadwin (95), Nick Taylor (102), Jon Curran (105), Zac Blair (106) and Carlos Ortiz (112).

References

External links
Coverage on the PGA Tour's official site

FedEx Cup
FedEx Cup Playoffs